ARC Iuridica Prague is a Czech rugby club based in Prague.

History

Early years
The club was founded in 1956. It started when Zdeněk Sláma, a former Czechoslovak international, joined the Department of Physical Education at the Charles University in Prague. He began teaching rugby as an optional physical education subject.

In 1959 they took on the Law School and the Faculty of Nuclear Physics in an intra-university tournament to determine the university champions. 

1971 saw them undertake their first overseas tour to Moscow, losing all three matches played; 0-54 and 3-30 to MAI and 3-40 to MVTU.

Recent history
On 7 November 2009, an old boys tournament was held in Prague in celebration of the 100th anniversary of the birth of club founder Zdeněk Sláma. The club's old boys took on Old Boys Prague and the Moravian Eagles.

Historical names
 Rugby University Praha (1955-1959)
 Slavia VŠ Praha (1959-1960)
 Slavia HF UK Praha (1969-1977)
  (1977-1990)
  (1990-1995)
  (1995-)

Notable former players
 Pavel Telička - diplomat, president of the Czech Rugby Union (ČSRU)

External links
ARC Iuridica Prague
 80 let Českého Ragby (80 years of Czech Rugby)
 Prof. Zdeněk Sláma 1909 -1993

Czech rugby union teams
Sport in Prague
Rugby clubs established in 1955
1955 establishments in Czechoslovakia